Helichrysum pedunculatum is a species of flowering plant in the family Asteraceae, native to South Africa and Lesotho. It is used in traditional medicine to prevent infection after circumcision.

References

pedunculatum
Flora of the Cape Provinces
Flora of the Free State
Flora of Lesotho
Plants described in 1973